The Oldenburg Computer Museum (OCM) is a museum founded in 2008 in Oldenburg (Oldb), Lower-Saxony, Germany that is dedicated to the preservation and operational presentation of the history of home computing.

Overview 
The museum presents computers, video games and arcade game machines from the 1970s through 1990s. What is special about the Oldenburger Computer Museum is the fact that the exhibits are functional and invite visitors to try out and use them. Founded in 2008 by the non-profit association "Oldenburger Computer-Museum e. V.”, which is organised and run by dedicated volunteers. The goal of the Oldenburger Computer Museum is the preservation of the home computer culture as an interactive exhibition with fully functional exhibits. Everything on exhibit is equipped with software, which can - and should - be used, explored and experienced. In this way, visitors can get a sense of how computer technology has developed over time and how it relates to current technology, especially with regard to aspects like; graphics, sound, speed, mass storage, and the reduction in size of components.
At the Oldenburger Computer Museum one can play classic games on the Commodore C64, Atari 2600 and Commodore Amiga, write their own programs on original software and experience hands-on the history of computing.

History 
The museum grew out of the private collection of Thiemo Eddiks. In the beginning, small temporary exhibitions were presented in the OFFIS - Institute for Computer Science and the Carl von Ossietzky University in Oldenburg as well as in other locations. In November 2008, the permanent exhibition was officially opened. In November 2009 the association, “Oldenburger Computer- Museum e. V.” was founded und was recognized as a non-profit organization. Initially started as an exhibition in a small space, the move to the current larger location took place in 2014. In addition to the permanent exhibition “Home computers of the 1970’s and 80’s”, a classic video arcade hall has also been created.

Exhibition 
The permanent exhibition, “Homecomputers of the 1970’s and 1980’s" showcases 23 functional computer systems, including PDP-8, Commodore PET, Apple II, Osborne 1, Amstrad CPC 464, Apple Macintosh and Amiga 500 and is open very Tuesday from 6pm until 9pm.

Literature

References

External links 
 Oldenburger Computer Museum website
 
 

2014 establishments in Germany
Buildings and structures in Oldenburg (city)
Computer museums
Museums established in 2008
Museums in Lower Saxony
Technology museums in Germany
Tourist attractions in Oldenburg (city)